The Boggs Lumber and Hardware Building, also known as the Eckley Grange Hall, is a historic building at 125 N. Main St. in Eckley, Colorado.  Built in 1915, it was listed on the National Register of Historic Places in 1985.

It was the first of five brick buildings in Eckley built in the 20th century and is the oldest surviving commercial building in the town.

References

Commercial buildings on the National Register of Historic Places in Colorado
Yuma County, Colorado
Grange organizations and buildings in Colorado
National Register of Historic Places in Yuma County, Colorado
Commercial buildings completed in 1915